Huntress is an American heavy metal band. It was founded in the underground music scene of Highland Park, California when lead vocalist Jill Janus moved to Los Angeles where she met an underground metal band called 'Professor' in 2009. Huntress was signed by Napalm Records in November 2011. A debut EP Off with Her Head was released in 2010. On December 27, 2011, they released their first single, "Eight of Swords", to promote their debut album, Spell Eater.

In October 2015, Janus posted a now-deleted note on Facebook announcing the band would finish its activities, but that she would continue to make music. Lead guitarist Blake Meahl, however, dismissed her statement as a consequence of her health and mental issues, and said the band would continue to perform.

On August 14, 2018, Jill Janus died by suicide.

Style

The band's style has been observed as classic heavy metal with influences of thrash and dark metal. The songs featured frequent screaming by lead vocalist Janus, who was classically trained and had a vocal range of four octaves.

Band members
Current members
Blake Meahl – lead guitar, backing vocals (2009–present)
Eli Santana – rhythm guitar, backing vocals (2014–present)
Tyler Meahl – drums (2014–present)
Eric Harris – bass (2010–2012, 2016–present)

Former members
Jill Janus – lead vocals (2009–2018; her death)
Ian Alden – bass (2012–2015), rhythm guitar (2009–2012)
Greg Imhoff – bass (2009–2010)
Sean Ford – drums (2009–2010)
Carl Wierzbicky – drums (2010–2014)
Anthony Crocamo – rhythm guitar (2012–2013)
Spencer Jacob Grau – bass (2015–2016)

Timeline

Discography
Studio albums 

EPs

Music videos

Awards and nominations

References

External links

2009 establishments in California
Heavy metal musical groups from California
Musical groups established in 2009
Musical quintets
Napalm Records artists
Thrash metal musical groups from California